The Copa Santa Catarina is a tournament organized by the Santa Catarina State Football Federation every second half of the season. It is played by Santa Catarina state teams. The competition's winner gains the right to compete in the same year's Recopa Sul-Brasileira and in the following year's Campeonato Brasileiro Série D. The competition was formed in 1990.

Format
In the 2007 season, the competition was played by five clubs and it was divided in three stages. The clubs played against each once in each of the first two stages, and the winners of both stages played the final in two legs.

List of champions

Titles by team

References

External links
 Federação Catarinense de Futebol

State football cup competitions in Brazil
Football competitions in Santa Catarina